Kelsey Martin is a professor of biological chemistry, psychiatry and biobehavioral sciences at UCLA and the director of the Simons Foundation Autism Research Initiative and the Simons Foundation Neuroscience Collaborations. She was the former dean of David Geffen School of Medicine at UCLA from 2015 to 2021., and was the first woman to be named Dean of the UCLA medical school, and was one of just a few female medical school Deans in the United States. She has been the director of the Simons Foundation Autism Research Initiative, Neuroscience Collaborations since September 2021.

Education and career
Martin majored in English and American Language and Literature at Harvard University, earning her B.A. cum laude in 1979. She spent two years volunteering with the Peace Corps in Zaire before resuming her post-graduate education. Martin returned to the United States and obtained her MD/PhD degree from Yale University in 1992. Her graduate thesis work investigated the nuclear transport of influenza virus ribonucleoproteins in the laboratory of Ari Helenius. She went on to postdoctoral training with Eric Kandel at the Center for Neurobiology and Behavior at Columbia University. At Columbia University, she made the seminal discovery that a single axonal branch can be the substrate for synaptic plasticity associated with learning and memory.

Honors 
In 2016, Martin was elected to the American Academy of Arts and Sciences.

In 2016, Martin was elected to the National Academy of Medicine.

Personal life
Kelsey Martin is the daughter of Dr. George Martin, professor of pathology emeritus at the University of Washington, and a prominent researcher in the study of human aging.

References

External links
Official website

Living people
David Geffen School of Medicine at UCLA faculty
Harvard University alumni
Yale School of Medicine alumni
Columbia University alumni
Fellows of the American Academy of Arts and Sciences
Members of the National Academy of Medicine
Year of birth missing (living people)